Richard Riley (born 1933) is an American politician.

Richard Riley may also refer to:

Rich Riley (born 1973), American entrepreneur
Richard Riley (footballer), English footballer
Richie Riley (born 1983), American basketball coach

See also
 Dick Riley (died 2010), American gun shop owner, state senator and president of the NRA